Jean-Lou Chameau (born 1953) is a French civil engineer who served as the president of King Abdullah University of Science and Technology (KAUST) from 2013 to 2017, and California Institute of Technology from 2006 to 2013. In addition, he previously served as a Dean of Engineering and provost of the Georgia Institute of Technology.

Early life and education
Chameau was born in France in 1953. He received his secondary, undergraduate, and graduate education in France where he attended the École nationale supérieure des arts et métiers (aka. Arts et Métiers ParisTech). He later went to the United States to obtain his Ph.D in civil engineering from Stanford University in 1981 while working under the direction of G. Wayne Clough.

Career
In 1980, Chameau joined Purdue University, where he became full professor in civil engineering and Head of the geotechnical engineering program.  In 1991, he was nominated director of the School of Civil and Environmental Engineering at Georgia Tech. He then became Dean of Engineering  before progressing to Provost at Georgia Tech.

Chameau became president of Caltech on 1 September 2006, succeeding David Baltimore who served nearly nine years in the post. On February 16, 2013, Chameau was appointed the president of King Abdullah University of Science and Technology, succeeding the founding president, Shih Choon Fong. Chameau retired as the president of KAUST in August 2017

In 2010, he was awarded membership in the Legion of Honour in the grade of Chevalier.

Personal life
Chameau is married to Carol Carmichael, former director of the Institute for Sustainable Technology and Development, now known as the Brook Byers Institute for Sustainable Systems at Georgia Tech.

References

External links
KAUST biography

 

1953 births
Living people
French civil engineers
American civil engineers
Arts et Métiers ParisTech alumni
Stanford University alumni
Presidents of the California Institute of Technology
Georgia Tech faculty
Chevaliers of the Légion d'honneur
French expatriates in the United States